Shelley Mitchell (born August 8, 1952) is an American actress, teacher, performance coach and writer. She is best known for her critically acclaimed adaptation and stage performance of Talking with Angels: Budapest 1943, the true story of Gitta Mallasz.
She teaches at her studio in Los Angeles, Duse Studio of Dramatic Art, where techniques used in class are based on the legacy of Eleonora Duse,  whom many consider to be the first modern actor and the mother of Method Acting.  Shelley Mitchell co-founded Slauson R.C. Theater School in south central Los Angeles with Shia LaBeouf and Bobby Soto, and produced their first Sacred Spectacle event featuring the Slauson R.C. players.

Background 
Shelley Mitchell was born and raised in Detroit, Michigan.  Her father, a tool and die maker, was a first generation Canadian and her mother, a housewife, was a first generation American; both came from eastern European Jewish families.  In the 1970s she trained extensively with Lee Strasberg in his private class and at the Actors Studio.  She also attended Emerson College, Circle in the Square Theater School and earned a Bachelor of Science degree in nursing from New York University.

Career 
Mitchell first performed Talking with Angels: Budapest, 1943 on September 19, 2001, at the Milagro Theater in New York City.
She has performed it over 400 times at salons and festivals in the USA and internationally at the Irish (2006), Dutch (2010) and Edinburgh (2015) theater festivals.

On film she can be seen in "Green is Gold", the 2016 Audience Choice Award winner at the Los Angeles Film Festival.  It was written, directed by and stars her student, Ryon Baxter. Mitchell also appeared in Sorry to Bother You, a satire film featured at the 2018 Sundance Film Festival, and written and directed by her student, Boots Riley.

Shelley Mitchell began teaching acting in 1986, after attending a UNESCO conference in Venice, Italy called Science and the Boundaries of Knowledge: the Prologue of our Cultural Past. The conference stressed the importance of "transdisciplinary research through a dynamic exchange between the natural sciences, the social sciences, art and tradition." Inspired by the message of the conference, she began teaching Method Acting techniques in Venice at a theater on the Giudecca and eventually added classes in Treviso, Vicenza and Trieste.  In 1992, she repatriated to the United States and settled in San Francisco where she taught dramatic art for over 20 years at The Actors Center of San Francisco. She has given workshops and performances at The Esalen Institute, The California Institute of Integral Studies, The Institute of Noetic Science, The Carl Jung Institute of San Francisco, The Dutch International Theater Festival and at the Festa del Cinema di Roma. She moved to Los Angeles in 2014.

Living in the Bay Area brought Shelley Mitchell in close contact with Silicon Valley personalities and business professionals of all stripes wanting to improve their public speaking and media presence.  In addition to private clients in the legal and software development field she worked as a consultant for Union Bank and The North Face.

Personal life 
Shelley Mitchell married Luciano Tommassini (1948-1995) in 1988, they had one child, Audrey Tommassini. 
From 1975 to 1989 Mitchell lived off the grid as part of an international Gurdjieff/Ouspensky Fourth Way community.

References

External links 
 Duse Studio of Dramatic Art
 Talking with Angels
 Shelley Mitchell Training

1952 births
Living people
New York University alumni
American expatriates in Italy
Place of birth missing (living people)
Actresses from Los Angeles
Emerson College alumni
21st-century American women